Castel Castagna  is a town and comune in the province of Teramo in the Abruzzo region of central-southern Italy.
It is a small hilltop town with a view of the Gran Sasso massif.

References

Cities and towns in Abruzzo